Jane Bowers (May 29, 1921 – June 18, 2000) was a Texas folk singer and songwriter best known for her composition "Remember the Alamo". Many of her songs were primarily recorded by the Kingston Trio.

Selected songs
"Buddy Better Get on Down the Line" (credited with Dave Guard)
"Coast of California" (credited with Dave Guard)
"El Matador" (credited with Irving Burgess)
"Remember the Alamo"
"San Miguel"
"Sea Fever"
"Señora" (credited with Dave Guard)
"Speckled Roan"
"To Be Redeemed"
"When I Was Young" (credited with Dave Guard)

References

External links
BMI Song list for Jane Bowers

American folk musicians
Singer-songwriters from Texas
1921 births
2000 deaths
20th-century American musicians
20th-century American singers